Vimoutiers is a commune in the Orne department in north-western France.

The finish line of the Paris–Camembert bicycle race is Vimoutiers.

History
In 1040 while besieging a nearby Norman castle, Alan III, Duke of Brittany died suddenly in Vimoutiers, then a possession of the Duchy of Normandy. His death was thought to be caused by poisoning. 

On 14 June 1944, during the Battle of Normandy, Vimoutiers was bombarded by Allied forces. The village was destroyed and 220 people died. With the encouragement of Margaret Mitchell, the author of Gone with the Wind, the members of Pilot Club International raised funds to restore the city. La Place du Pilot Club International is a square in Vimoutiers which commemorates their generosity. 400 people of Van Wert, Ohio also contributed in the costs of reconstruction and reparation of the town. They volunteered to pay for the replacement of Marie Harel's statue in 1953. This is recorded by a plaque in the market square of Vimoutiers.

A German Tiger I tank is on display on the outskirts of the city after being retrieved from abandonment in a roadside ditch in 1975. It is one of the world's remaining seven Tiger I tanks.

The beautiful and strategic location of Vimoutiers attracts numerous tourists for sporting events, recreation and overnight rest. Modern hotels and small restaurants cater to visitors.

Heraldry

Name
The name 'Vimoutiers' is a contraction of 'Vie', the name of the small river which runs through the town ('vie' means 'life'), and 'Moutiers', a French word which means 'Monastery'. This name is derived from the fact that there was once a monastery present on the site, near the banks of the river 'Vie.

Notable people
Vimoutiers was the birthplace of Joseph Laniel (1889–1975), politician of the Fourth Republic.

Twin towns
Vimoutiers is twinned with:
 Fordingbridge in England (since 1982)
 Sontra in Germany (since 1971)

See also
 Falaise pocket
 Communes of the Orne department
 Paul Bunel

References

External links

 Pictures of Vimoutiers before June 1944 (with a link to Charlotte Corday).
 Hôtel le Soleil d'Or
 Routard.com - Vimoutiers
 Vimoutiers Official Homepage (in English)

Communes of Orne